The 2015 Hockey City Classic was a doubleheader of two outdoor ice hockey games played on February 7, 2015 at Soldier Field in Chicago, Illinois. This was the third edition of the Hockey City Classic. The first game was played between Miami (OH) and Western Michigan and the second game was played between in-state rivals, Michigan and Michigan State.

Game 1: Miami (OH) vs. Western Michigan

The first game of the 2015 Hockey City Classic was played between the Miami RedHawks and the Western Michigan Broncos.

Number in parenthesis represents the player's total in goals or assists to that point of the season

Game 2: Michigan State vs. Michigan

The second game of the Hockey City Classic was played between the Michigan State Spartans and the Michigan Wolverines. This was Michigan's seventh outdoor Hockey Game since the Cold War as well as their fourth against Michigan State. Michigan was 2–3–1 in outdoor hockey games entering the Hockey City Classic, including 1–1–1 in outdoor games against Michigan State.

Number in parenthesis represents the player's total in goals or assists to that point of the season

References

2014–15 NCAA Division I men's ice hockey season
Outdoor ice hockey games
2015 in sports in Illinois
Michigan Wolverines men's ice hockey
Michigan State Spartans ice hockey